Mike Nyoni was a Zambian musician who rose from the band Born Free which was founded in 1972 by bandleader, drummer, and vocalist Nicky Mwanza, but the band never recorded until a complete personnel change. Star-in-the-making Mike Nyoni joined as vocalist and lead guitarist. The Band is known for the album Mukaziwa Chingoni.

Nyoni's style of music took a step away from the fuzz-rock sounds of Zamrock, opting to add wah-wah guitar pedals and overall funk elements.

He won Zambia's best solo artist in 1984 Zambia Daily Mail polls.

Discography

Studio albums
 My Own Thing
 Kawalala
 I Can't Understand You

Selected singles
 "Bo Ndate Sianga"
 "Infintu Ni Bwangu"
 "Fungo Lanjala"
 "Niyenda Kumudzi"

See also 
Music of Zambia

References 
 "Zambian Music Legends". Lulu. com, 2012. By Leonard Koloko
  MIKE NYONI & BORN FREE
  YouTube

External links 
Radio Diffusion 

Year of birth missing
Year of death missing
20th-century Zambian male singers
Now-Again Records artists